LaTanya is an African-American feminine given name from the root name Tatianus used in the United States. It is similar to the name Tanya. Notable people with this name include the following:

 LaTanya Garrett U.S. politician
 LaTanya Richardson (born 1949) U.S. actress
 LaTanya Sheffield (born 1963) U.S. athlete

See also

Latania, plant genus
LaTonya, given name
Lavanya (name)

Notes

Given names
Feminine given names
African-American feminine given names